Jenée LaMarque (born February 2, 1980, in West Covina, California) is an American writer and director, known for The Pretty One (2013), Spoonful (2012) and The Feels (2018).

Career
LaMarque acted in local theatre while growing up in Claremont, California. She got a degree in English with a creative writing emphasis in poetry from Stanford University. Screenwriting proved to be the combination of these two interests. She took UCLA extension classes in Screenwriting, before getting her MFA in Screenwriting from the AFI Conservatory. At AFI she wrote The Pretty One. LaMarque wrote and directed the short Spoonful, which premiered at the Sundance Film Festival in 2012. The Pretty One script was on The Black List in 2011, which helped LaMarque enlist top talent like Zoe Kazan playing both twins, and Jake Johnson, who plays her love interest. LaMarque was a finalist for the Tribeca Film Festival's award "The Nora" in 2013. The Pretty One was nominated for the 2014 Best Movie By a Woman by the Women Film Critics Circle. The Pretty One won Best Narrative Feature and Jenée won Best Director at the 2013 Savannah Film Festival.

Jenée's second feature The Feels starring Constance Wu, Angela Trimbur and Ever Mainard premiered in competition at The 2017 Seattle Film Festival. The Feels’ Ever Mainard won Best Actress at the 2017 Outfest and won Best Narrative Feature at the 2017 NewFest.

Filmography

Film

Television

Personal life
LaMarque has been married to Julian Wass since November 4, 2006. They have two children. She is Mexican American.

See also
 List of female film and television directors
 List of LGBT-related films directed by women

References

1980 births
Living people
American film directors
American women film directors
American women screenwriters
American film directors of Mexican descent
People from West Covina, California
21st-century American women